Prof. Rina Zaizov Marx (July 8, 1932 – May 31, 2005) the Israel Prize laureate for Medicine for 2005, was a renowned pediatrician who specialized in hemato-oncology. She established and directed the pediatric oncology ward at Schneider Children's Medical Center of Israel and was one of the most prominent researchers in the fields of hematology in the country. and the founder of the Hayim Association.

Notes

1932 births
2005 deaths
Israeli pediatricians
Israeli women physicians
Israel Prize in medicine recipients